Kanaskat-Palmer State Park is a  Washington state park on the Green River in King County. The park has  of river shoreline and offers picnicking, camping,  of trails for hiking and biking, expert-level rafting and kayaking in the Green River Gorge, fishing, swimming, birdwatching, wildlife viewing, and horseshoes.

References

External links

Kanaskat-Palmer State Park Washington State Parks and Recreation Commission 
Kanaskat-Palmer State Park Map Washington State Parks and Recreation Commission

State parks of Washington (state)
Parks in King County, Washington